Lise Bech (born 16 September 1961 in Esbjerg) is a Danish politician, who is a member of the Folketing for the Danish People's Party. She was elected into the Folketing in the 2015 Danish general election.

Political career
Bech was in the municipal council of Støvring Municipality from 1999 to 2006. She was later in the municipal council of Rebild Municipality from 2014 to 2015.

Bech first ran in the 2015 election, where she was elected after receiving 4,181 personal votes. She was reelected in the 2019 election with 2,306 votes, though this time her seat was a levelling seat. Since 2022, she has been a member of the Denmark Democrats party.

External links 
 Biography on the website of the Danish Parliament (Folketinget)

References 

Living people
1961 births
People from Esbjerg
20th-century Danish politicians
20th-century Danish women politicians
21st-century Danish women politicians
Women members of the Folketing
Danish People's Party politicians
Denmark Democrats politicians
Danish municipal councillors
Members of the Folketing 2015–2019
Members of the Folketing 2019–2022
Members of the Folketing 2022–2026